The 2001–02 EHF Champions League was the 42nd edition of Europe's premier club handball tournament.

Round 1

Round 2

Group stage

Group A

Group B

Group C

Group D

Knockout stage

Quarterfinals

Semifinals

Finals

References

External links 
 EHF Champions League website

 
EHF Champions League seasons
Champions League
Champions League